New Fist of Fury is a 1976 Hong Kong martial arts film directed by Lo Wei and starring Jackie Chan. It is the first of several films that Lo directed Chan in, and the first using Chan's stage name Sing Lung (literally meaning "becoming a dragon", by which Chan is still known today in Asia).

The film gave Chan his first starring role in a widely released film (his first starring role was in the Little Tiger of Canton, which only had a limited release in 1973). The film was a sequel to Bruce Lee's Fist of Fury, one of Lo Wei's biggest successes. Chan had previously appeared in the original Fist of Fury as a stuntman. New Fist of Fury was part of Lo's attempt to market Jackie Chan as the new Bruce Lee, and did not contain any of the comedy elements that were to be Chan's career trademark later on.

Cast
Jackie Chan / Cheng Long / Sing Lung as Ah Lung / Dragon
Nora Miao as Mao Li Er / Miss Lee
Chan Sing as Okimura
Luk Yat-lung as Lon Si Chun
Yim Chung as Master Su, Mao's grandfather
Suen Lam as Taiwan police captain Lin
Cheng Siu-siu as Okimura's daughter
Lau Ming as Ah Lung's mother
Han Ying-chieh as Hung
Lo Wei as Inspector
Chiang Kam as Sampo
Liu Ping as Lin Chin Kui
Bruce Lee as Chen Jun (extra)

Alternate versions
In 1976, the film was released in Mandarin with a counterpart English version for export.
To capitalise on Jackie Chan's success with The Young Master, the film was re-edited (removing 40 minutes of footage), given a Cantonese soundtrack and re-released in 1980.

Plot

1976 version
A brother and sister escape from Japanese-occupied Shanghai to Japanese-occupied Taiwan, to stay with their grandfather who runs a Kung-Fu school there. However, the master of a Japanese Karate school in Taiwan has designs on bringing all other schools on the island under his domination, and part of his plan involves the murder of the siblings' grandfather. Undaunted, the brother and sister reestablish their grandfather's school, leading to a final confrontation with the Japanese Karate master. Jackie Chan plays a young thief who at first does not want to learn Kung-fu, but finally realizes that he can no longer stand by and let the Japanese trample the rights of the Chinese people. He proves extremely adept at the martial arts, and carries the fight to its final conclusion.

1980 version
Jackie Chan plays a young Taiwanese thief who steals a nunchaku after fighting with a pair of Japanese men, he assumes they belong to the local Japanese kung fu school (Da Yang Gate). The school offers him a job in a casino but refuses, and is beaten up as a result. He is rescued by the surviving members of the Jingwu school and is invited to Mao Li Uhr's grandfather's 80th birthday celebration where a group of Japanese decide to gatecrash. This causes Mao Li Uhr's grandfather to die of a heart attack. The remaining Jingwu student's acquire his home and convert it into a new Jingwu school. The Japanese council closes down the school and Jackie Chan finally realizes that he can no longer stand by and let the Japanese trample the rights of the Chinese people. He proves extremely adept at the martial arts, and carries the fight to its final conclusion.

Box office
In Hong Kong, the film grossed 456,787.20.

DVD releases
On 18 June 2001, Seven 7 released the French theatrical version in 2.35:1 entitled La Nouvelle Fureur De Vaincre. The DVD featured no other language options.
On 12 March 2002, Columbia Tristar Home Entertainment released the 1976 version in 2.35:1 with Mandarin and English soundtracks. However, it featured dubtitles and is very slightly cut.
On 25 March 2002, Eastern Heroes released an uncut version. However, this was cropped from 2.35:1 to 1.78:1 and only included an English dub. An extras was the export English trailer.
On 25 October 2005, Universal Japan released the 1980 Cantonese version in 2.35:1, using newly restored materials from Fortune Star. However, it features no English subtitles.
On 21 May 2007, Hong Kong Legends also released the 1980 version, but instead contained the first soundtrack of Mandarin (in abridged form) with newly translated English subtitles and an English dub. An extra is the first ten minutes of the export English version.

See also
 Jackie Chan filmography
 List of Hong Kong films
 List of martial arts films

References

External links

1976 films
1976 martial arts films
1970s action films
1970s martial arts films
Bruceploitation films
Films directed by Lo Wei
Hong Kong martial arts films
Kung fu films
Wushu films
Hong Kong sequel films
Martial arts films
1970s Mandarin-language films
1970s Hong Kong films